William Dilworth Puleston (September 1, 1881 – September 30, 1968) was an American naval officer and author. He served as Director of Naval Intelligence, 1934-1937. He was considered "a popular, articulate and aggressive officer" and "an ideal planner, a student of world history and foreign affairs."

Early life
William Puleston was one of four sons and two daughters of Samuel Richard Puleston, M.D., (born 22 March 1845 in Carmarthen, Wales-died Monticello, Florida, 1904) and his wife Lulu Dilworth Puleston.  His father came from a family that originated in Willington Worthenbury, Wales, and emigrated to Florida to be with his uncle.

Naval career

Puleston entered the U.S. Naval Academy in 1898 and graduated in 1902. Promoted to ensign in 1904, he was promoted through the ranks to captain in 1926. He served in various ships until 1912, when he took command of the destroyer .

In 1914-15, as a lieutenant, he attended the Naval War College and stayed on for an additional year on the staff in 1915-16, during which time he assisted the College's president, Rear Admiral Austin M. Knight, in preparing the first history of the College.

In January 1918, he was ordered to Queenstown, Ireland for duty with U.S. Naval Forces in Europe. For this service in World War I, he received the Navy Cross for heroism in convoy duty. His citation read:

The Navy Cross is awarded to Commander William D. Puleston, U.S. Navy, for distinguished service in the line of his profession as commanding officer of the U.S.S. Stringham, the U.S.S. Sigourney and the U.S.S. Cushing, engaged in the important, exacting and hazardous duty of patrolling the waters infested with enemy submarines and mines, in escorting and protecting vitally important convoys of troops and supplies through these waters, and in offensive and defensive action, vigorously and unremittingly prosecuted against all forms of enemy naval activity.

After commanding the transport , he went on to command  the battleship .

On 4 June 1934, Puleston took up the post of Director of Naval Intelligence. Taking over at a time of shrinking budgets for intelligence activities, Puleston  faced a difficult situation. During his three-year tenure, the United States  faced threats from subversive radical groups within the United States as well as from foreign agents. Among the most prominent cases he dealt with were the cases of the spies Harry Thompson, the former U.S. Navy sailor who spied for Japan in 1934-35, and John Semer Farnsworth. At the same time he initiated greater attention to Japan and China.

Under Puleston's period as Director, Congress authorized the expansion of the staff in Washington and established new attaché offices in 1936 at Rio de Janeiro and Lima, Peru. The offices at Berlin, Germany, Brussels, Belgium, Buenos Aires, London, Paris, Peking, Paris, and Tokyo continued.  In addition, he laid the plans for new offices to open in 1937 in Santiago, Chile and Bogotá, Colombia. In Puleston's final "ONI Estimate of the Situation for 1939," issued just before his retirement in April 1937, he called for more counter-intelligence to deal with the rapidly changing world political and military situation.

Later career
Captain Puleston was recalled to active duty and served as special advisor to the Secretary of the Treasury, 1939-40. Following the attack on Pearl Harbor, he was recalled again in January 1942 and served during World War II as special advisor on economic warfare to the Secretary of the Navy. For this service, he was awarded the Legion of Merit in 1945. His citation described his service, as follows

Personal
Puleston married Marian Stanwood Emery (May 7, 1885 – May 16, 1974) on August 12, 1911 in Falmouth, Maine. Bishop Robert Codman officiated at the ceremony.

Puleston and his wife retired to Maine. They were buried at Evergreen Cemetery in Portland, Maine.

Publications

Books
 The Dardanelles Expedition: A Condensed Study (Naval Institute, 1925)
 High Command in the World War (C. Scribner's Sons, 1934)
 The Life and Work of Alfred Thayer Mahan (Yale University Press, 1939)
 The Armed Forces of the Pacific: A Comparison of the Military and Naval Power of the United States and Japan (Yale University Press, 1941)
 Annapolis: Gangway to the Quarterdeck [A History of the Naval Academy] (1942) — online HTML in full (Thayer's American Naval History site)
 The Influence of Sea Power in World War II (Yale University Press, 1947)
 The Influence of Force in Foreign Relations (D.Van Nostrand, 1955)

Contributions to Periodicals
 Scientific American, contributing editor 
 Scribners Atlantic Monthly United States Naval Institute ProceedingsAwards & Decorations

  Navy Cross
  Legion of Merit
  Spanish Campaign Medal
  Mexican Service Medal
  World War I Victory Medal
  American Defense Service Medal
  Swedish Order of the Sword
 Swedish Order of Vasa
 Venezuelan Order of the Liberator 
 Belgian Order of Leopold II.

References

Additional Sources
   Papers of Captain William D. Puleston at Naval History and Heritage Command, Washington D.C.
 Naval War College, Naval Historical Collection, Newport, R.I.:
 Ms Coll 233: One folder of correspondence, 1947–48, with notes on freedom of the seas, 1929
 Ms item 61: Translation of The Naval War in the Dardanelles'' by Captain A. Thomasi, French Navy
 Ms item 77: Letter to Sir John Fortescue, 28 February 1933, regarding his comments on George Washington
 The Alfred Thayer Mahan Papers at the Library of Congress contain   Puleston's research materials on Mahan and his family 
 The John Callan O'Laughlin papers (1895-1949) at the Library of Congress  Puleston-O'Laughlin correspondence 
 The Fleet Admiral Ernest J. King Papers at the Library of Congress contain the  Puleston-King Correspondence
 The Franklin D. Roosevelt Library, Hyde Park, NY   Puleston-Cox Correspondence in The Papers of Oscar Cox
   Puleston's service dress uniform jacket with ribbons, biography

1881 births
1968 deaths
People from Monticello, Florida
United States Naval Academy alumni
United States Navy officers
Naval War College alumni
United States Navy personnel of World War I
United States Army War College alumni
Stetson University alumni
American Presbyterians
American naval historians
American male non-fiction writers
Recipients of the Navy Cross (United States)
Recipients of the Legion of Merit
Directors of the Office of Naval Intelligence
Burials at Evergreen Cemetery (Portland, Maine)
20th-century American male writers
Historians from Florida